This is a list of child actors from the Netherlands. Films and/or television series they appeared in are mentioned only if they were still a child at the time of filming.

Current child actors (under the age of eighteen) are indicated by boldface.

G 
Tess Gaerthé (born 1991)
Verder dan de maan (2003)

K 
Melody Klaver (born 1990)
Mijn zusje Zlata (2003)
Diep (2005)
Langer licht (2006)
Afblijven (2006)

M 
Danny de Munk (born 1970) 
Ciske de Rat (1984)
Op Hoop van Zegen (1986)

S 
Tessa Schram (nl) (born 1988)
Een echte hond (1998)
Little Crumb (1999)
Pietje Bell II: De jacht op de tsarenkroon (2003)

W 
Jolijn van de Wiel (born 1992)
Hoe overleef ik mezelf? (2008)
Kinderen geen bezwaar (2009)

List
Netherlands